The Cycle Is Complete is debut and only full-length studio album by the Canadian musician Bruce Palmer, released on September 4, 1970 by Verve Forecast. The album was re-issued on CD by Collectors' Choice in 2003. Because of issues with the original masters, the music on the re-release was significantly remixed and content from alternate takes was used to replace some of the original music, especially on "Alpha - Omega - Apocalypse".

Track listing

Personnel
Adapted from The Cycle Is Complete liner notes.

Musicians
 Richard Aplanalp – oboe, flute
 Rick James – vocals, percussion
 Jeff Kaplan – piano
 Paul Lagos – drums
 Bruce Palmer – acoustic guitar, electric guitar, bass guitar, production
 Templeton Parcely – violin
 Danny Ray – congas
 Ed Roth – organ

Production and additional personnel
 Ed Caraeff – photography
 Don Hall – production
 Dave Hassinger – engineering

Release history

References

External links 
 

1970 debut albums
Verve Forecast Records albums